Kory L. Kath (born July 1977) is a Minnesota politician and former member of the Minnesota House of Representatives who represented District 26A, which included all or portions of Steele and Waseca counties in the southeastern part of the state. A Democrat, Kath was also an American Studies, Economics and Political Science teacher at Owatonna High School in Owatonna, where he is currently Principal.

Kath was first elected in 2008, succeeding four-term Rep. Connie Ruth, who did not seek re-election. He was re-elected in 2010. He was vice chair of the House K-12 Education Policy and Oversight Committee, and was a member of the Agriculture, Rural Economies and Veterans Affairs Committee and the Public Safety Policy and Oversight Committee. He also served on the Finance Subcommittee for the State Government Finance Division, and on the Public Safety Policy and Oversight Subcommittee for the Crime Victims/Criminal Records Division.

Kath graduated from Gustavus Adolphus College in St. Peter in 2000, receiving his B.A. in Political Science and Secondary Education. He went on to Southwest Minnesota State University in Marshall, earning his M.S. in Educational Leadership. Prior to becoming a teacher, he worked as a constituent advocate for the late U.S. Senator Paul Wellstone.

References

External links 

 Rep. Kath Web Page
 Project Votesmart - Rep. Kory Kath Profile
 Mankato Free Press 12/30/2008: "Kory Kath hits ground running"

1977 births
Living people
People from Owatonna, Minnesota
Southwest Minnesota State University alumni
Democratic Party members of the Minnesota House of Representatives
Gustavus Adolphus College alumni
21st-century American politicians
People from Steele County, Minnesota